The Ekityki Lake (Ozero Ekityki) is a lake in the Chukotka Mountains, in the Siberian Far East. It belongs to the Ekityki river basin and the Ekityki River flows through it.

Geography
Like all lakes of the tundra, it is frozen for the greatest part of the year.

Lake Ekityki is the only location in the whole Eurasian continent where the Pygmy whitefish is found.

This lake and the whole Ekityki river basin belong to the Chukotka Autonomous Okrug administrative region of Russia.

See also 
List of lakes of Russia

References

External links
Озеро Экитыки Picture 
Tourism and Environmental data
Lakes of Chukotka Autonomous Okrug
Chukotka Mountains